Michael James Dunleavy (born May 5, 1961) is an American educator and politician serving as the 12th governor of Alaska. A Republican, he was a member of the Alaska Senate from 2013 to 2018. He defeated former Democratic United States senator Mark Begich in the 2018 gubernatorial election after incumbent governor Bill Walker dropped out of the race. He was re-elected in 2022.

Early life, education, and teaching career
Dunleavy was born and raised in Scranton, Pennsylvania. After graduating from Scranton Central High School in 1979, he earned a Bachelor of Arts in history at Misericordia University in 1983. He earned his master's degree in education from the University of Alaska Fairbanks. In 1983, he moved to Alaska and his first job was at a logging camp in Southeast Alaska. Later, Dunleavy pursued his dream of becoming a teacher. He earned his teacher's certificate, and then a master of education degree from the University of Alaska Fairbanks. He spent nearly two decades in northwest Arctic communities working as a teacher, principal, and superintendent. Dunleavy's wife, Rose, is from the Kobuk River Valley community of Noorvik. They have three children – Maggie, Catherine, and Ceil – who were raised in both rural and urban Alaska. In 2004 Dunleavy and his family moved to Wasilla, where he owned an educational consulting firm and worked on a number of  statewide educational projects. Before his election to the Alaska Senate, Dunleavy served on the Matanuska-Susitna Borough board, including two years as the board's president.

State legislative career
Dunleavy challenged incumbent state senator Linda Menard (redistricted from District G) for the District D August 28, 2012 Republican Primary and won with 2,802 votes (57.42%). He was unopposed in the November 6 general election and won with 11,724 votes (94.24%) against write-in candidates.

Governor of Alaska

Elections

2018 

In 2017, Dunleavy announced he would run for governor in 2018 but abandoned the race in September 2017, citing heart problems. In December 2017 he announced his return to the race.
He resigned his senate seat effective January 15, 2018, to focus on his campaign. Retired United States Air Force lieutenant colonel Mike Shower was chosen as his successor by Governor Bill Walker and confirmed by the Alaska Senate caucus after numerous replacement candidates were rejected.

2022 

In August 2021, Dunleavy announced his candidacy for reelection in 2022. He was reelected with 50.3% of the vote, becoming the first incumbent Republican governor to be reelected since Jay Hammond in 1978 and the first governor of any political affiliation to be reelected since Tony Knowles in 1998.

Tenure 

Dunleavy and Kevin Meyer were the Republican nominees for governor and lieutenant governor of Alaska, respectively, and were elected in the November 2018 general election. Dunleavy was sworn in on December 3, 2018. He appointed Kevin Clarkson to be Alaska attorney general.

On September 6, 2022, a complaint was filed against Dunleavy alleging that his campaign was paying staffers with state funds.<ref>Dunleavy accused of using state funds to pay campaign staffers and violating campaign finance rules, Alaska Public Media, Kavitha George, September 7, 2022. Retrieved September 7, 2022.</ref>

On June 28, 2019, Dunleavy exercised line-item veto authority as governor to make cuts of $433 million, including a cut of $130 million (41%) of state contributions to the University of Alaska.

Also on June 28, 2019, Dunleavy vetoed $335,000 from the budget of the Alaska Supreme Court, stating that he did so because the Court had held that the state was constitutionally required to provide public funding for elective abortions.

In September 2020, Dunleavy agreed to reimburse the state $2,800 for allegedly partisan advertisements that were paid for with state funds. Dunleavy did not admit to wrongdoing, but stated that it was in the best interest of the state to resolve the allegations.

 Recall attempt 
On July 15, 2019, an effort to recall Dunleavy began after a public backlash over his cuts to public assistance, education and the University of Alaska ($135 million cut to state funding, about a 41% reduction). It was the second recall petition against a governor in Alaska history, the first being the failed petition against Governor Wally Hickel. Had the recall election been successful, Lieutenant Governor Kevin Meyer would have become governor.

To have the petition certified by the Division of Elections, the petitioners were first required to submit 28,501 signatures (approximately 10% of the voting population in Alaska's last general election). On September 5, 2019, volunteers submitted 49,006 petition signatures. On November 4, 2019, the Division of Elections declined to certify the recall petition after the Alaska attorney general Kevin Clarkson, a Dunleavy appointee, issued a legal opinion. Clarkson acknowledged that the petitioners had submitted enough signatures and paid the necessary fees, but asserted that "the four allegations against the governor 'fail to meet any of the listed grounds for recall—neglect of duty, incompetence, or lack of fitness'". The petitioners said they would appeal the division's decision.

In January 2020, Anchorage Superior Court Judge Eric Aarseth rejected the division's decision not to certify the recall petition. The state appealed Aarseth's ruling to the Alaska Supreme Court, which on May 8 affirmed that the recall effort could proceed.

Recall petitions in Alaska have two rounds. The second round requires 25% of the votes cast in the previous general election. Once the second completed petition is submitted to the Division of Elections it will either accept or refuse the petition. The deadline to submit signatures for the petition is 180 days before the end of the governor's term, which in this case is June 8, 2022. If a recall is successful, the vacancy is filled "as a vacancy caused by any other means". If a recall election against the governor is successful, the lieutenant governor finishes the term. If the petition is accepted, the Division of Elections schedules a recall election.

On February 18, 2021, the recall campaign announced it had 55,613 signatures of the 71,252 required to submit the second petition to the Division of Elections. On March 18, 2021, Dunleavy said he believed the recall election would occur in the summer of 2021 and planned to campaign to remain in office. As of August 21, 2021, 62,373 signatures had been collected.

The "Recall Dunleavy" effort failed to submit enough signatures to trigger a recall election in November 2020 or in 2021. As of December 2022, not enough signatures have been collected, and Dunleavy won a second term as governor in November 2022 as part of the usual electoral process, making him the first governor to be reelected since Tony Knowles in 1998, and the first Republican governor to be reelected since Jay Hammond in 1978.

Graphical summary of recall opinions polling

Notes

Partisan clients

 Political positions 

 COVID-19 

On March 11, 2020, Dunleavy's office declared a state of emergency to ensure all entities had the necessary response resources a day before the first case arrived via a foreign national in Anchorage.

On March 13, 2020, Dunleavy ordered public schools to close from March 16 to 30.

In April 2020, Dunleavy activated the State Emergency Operations Center under Alaska's Department of Military and Veterans Affairs. Joint Task Force-Alaska was stood up to provide a coordinated effort for the Alaska Army and Air National Guard, the Alaska State Defense Force, and the Alaska Naval Militia to support the state.

On May 19, 2020, Dunleavy announced the lifting of all state mandates for businesses and public gatherings, keeping only a mandatory (but unenforced) quarantine period for persons coming from out of state.

In June 2020, Dunleavy announced a new extension of the two-week quarantine measure that required visitors to Alaska to present a negative test for the virus if they were not willing to self-quarantine for two weeks.

In April 2021, Dunleavy announced that Alaska would offer free vaccinations to tourists at major airports starting June 1, 2021, as part of the United States' vaccination campaign.

On October 8, 2021, Dunleavy refused to issue another COVID-19 disaster declaration, thinking it unnecessary. "Exercising the Disaster Act does not give our team any more health tools than what they need and are using right now", he said, adding, "Masking is, as I have stated, a local issue best left to local leaders."

On October 15, 2021, Dunleavy clarified that he didn't endorse mask or vaccine mandates but wouldn't ban them either.

In November 2021, Dunleavy ordered state agencies to ignore federal vaccine mandates, arguing that they were "unconstitutional" and "completely unnecessary," claiming that Alaska had handled COVID better than nearly every other state.

 Abortion 
Dunleavy opposes abortion. In July 2019, he vetoed $334,700 for the state to pay for abortions from the court system's budget. The Dunleavy administration wrote, "The legislative and executive branch are opposed to state-funded elective abortions; the only branch of government that insists on state-funded elective abortions is the Supreme Court." A year later, Anchorage Superior Court Judge Jennifer S. Henderson ruled that Dunleavy's vetoes in 2019 and 2020 were unconstitutional and violated the separation of powers doctrine: "In spite of this Court’s faith that the Alaska judiciary remains independent and committed to its essential function of deciding cases according to the rule of law, the Court must unfortunately conclude that in vetoing funds appropriated to the State appellate courts in express retaliation against the Alaska Supreme Court for its legal decision-making, the Governor violated the separation of powers doctrine."

 Environment 
Dunleavy rejects the scientific consensus on climate change. In February 2019, he abolished Alaska's climate change task force, a team instated by Bill Walker, calling it unnecessary.

In September 2019, during a meeting at the International Forum of Sovereign Wealth Funds with Mark Gordon, Dunleavy said that warming the Arctic could be good for Alaska, believing that it could create further business opportunities. In October 2019, Dunleavy clashed with Representative Alexandria Ocasio-Cortez on Twitter over the Green New Deal proposal, saying that the Green New Deal would impact our civilization as we know it.

In September 2020, Dunleavy expressed support for renewable energy ideas: "I know there’s a view on the part of some that a Republican governor that is supportive of Alaska’s resource extraction industries, including those around fossil fuels, would not want anything to do with renewables” and "It makes total sense to explore pumped hydro, using wind as a main source of energy and the reservoir as the batteries."

In February 2022, Dunleavy denounced the Biden Administration's request for suspension of the Ambler Road Project: "The Biden Administration has opened yet another front in its war on Alaska. You would think President Biden would want to improve access to American sources of copper and other strategic minerals that are needed in our combined efforts to increase renewables. Instead, actions like this only serve to push development to Third World nations that don't have the environmental ethic that Alaskans have. This pendulum swing away from the last federal administration's approval disregards extensive environmental studies and widespread social engagement while creating instability in long-term investment."

Dunleavy has encouraged the United States Environmental Protection Agency to approve the permit for Pebble Mine, which other Alaska politicians oppose because it would threaten the fishery of Bristol Bay.

 Criminal justice 
In January 2019, Dunleavy announced that he would declare "war on criminals" by proposing four bills that would increase criminal penalties for sexual offenses; reverse a range of reductions to sentences; add a new category of crime called terroristic threatening; increase bail and give judges more discretion in how people charged with crimes are released before trials; and reduce the use of parole. He said, "If you are a criminal, this is the beginning of the end for your activities", and "If you’re going to assault people—if you’re going to engage in sexual assaults, physical assaults—this is going to be a very unsafe place for you. We’re not going to tolerate it at all."

In May 2020, after the murder of George Floyd, Dunleavy called the act "horrific" and thanked Alaskans for their peaceful protests. "People absolutely have the right to protest: This is America," Dunleavy said. "What occurred in Minneapolis when Mr. Floyd was killed in that police action, we all know is terrible." But Dunleavy expressed concern that the protests in Alaska could spread COVID-19, noting that any events that combine people being in close proximity with singing and shouting can spread the virus. He emphasized advice from state officials that people at gatherings wear face masks or stay at least 6 to 10 feet away from others.

 Immigration 
In May 2022, Dunleavy expressed opposition to the termination of Title 42 by the Center for Disease Control: "The Termination Order is detrimental to the states tasked with enforcing immigration standards, and it is not logically appropriate" and "This policy runs contrary to the Biden Administration’s other declarations because it is expressly premised on the decrease of COVID-19, but the Administration has ignored these facts by enforcing mandatory vaccination and mask mandates."

 Voting rights 
In January 2022, Dunleavy called on legislators to improve election integrity by prohibiting automatic voter registration, tracking absentee balloting, requiring signature verification, and implementing voter roll maintenance, saying, "We just want to make sure that as we move forward in Alaska that our concerns, our worries, are taken care of."

Electoral history

 Notes 

References

External links

 
 
 Mike Dunleavy at 100 Years of Alaska's Legislature''
 

|-

|-

|-

|-

|-

|-

1961 births
21st-century American educators
21st-century American politicians
Republican Party Alaska state senators
Educators from Pennsylvania
Republican Party governors of Alaska
Living people
Misericordia University alumni
People from Wasilla, Alaska
Politicians from Scranton, Pennsylvania
School superintendents in Alaska
Schoolteachers from Alaska
University of Alaska Fairbanks alumni